Craig Tara is a holiday camp located near Ayr in South Ayrshire, Scotland. It is run by Haven Holidays, who took over and renamed the former Butlin's Ayr camp in 1999.

History

The site was built in 1940 and opened as a Butlins camp in 1947. In 1999, the camp became part of Haven Holidays, along with the Pwllheli camp, as part of an internal reorganisation within Bourne Leisure, which owned both Butlins and Haven. Haven Holidays renamed the site Craig Tara and replaced the chalet accommodation with static caravans.

On Site
On the site, the complex has franchise outlets of both Burger King and Papa John's. It also has its very own restaurant called "The Brigs of Ayr". It is known for keeping part of the original Butlins element alive with its Craig Tara funfair which is generally open. There is also a mini-golf course and, in common with all Haven Parks, live shows and entertainment hosted inside the main centre. There is also a mini Costa Coffee shop and a large swimming pool.

There is a bus that runs from the park to Ayr town centre, which runs on an hourly basis and makes three different stops in the city centre.

References 

Holiday camps
Buildings and structures in Ayr